Chee and T is a 2016 American comedy film written and directed by Tanuj Chopra and starring Sunkrish Bala and Dominic Rains.

Plot

Cast
Karan Soni as Roger Raval
Noureen DeWulf as Shana
Dominic Rains as T
Rebecca Hazlewood as Monie
Asif Ali as Mayunk
Bernard White as Uncle Rob
Lynn Chen as Lindo Chong
Sunkrish Bala as Chee

Release
The film made its world premiere on June 2, 2016 at the LA Film Festival.

Accolades
The film won the Special Jury Prize for Comedy at the LA Film Festival and the Best Narrative Feature Award at the San Diego Asian Film Festival.

References

External links
 
 
 

American comedy films
2010s English-language films
2010s American films